Zaheer Muhammad (born 20 April 1997) is a Zimbabwean cricketer. He made his List A debut for Mashonaland Eagles in the 2017–18 Pro50 Championship on 22 May 2018.

References

External links
 

1997 births
Living people
Zimbabwean cricketers
Place of birth missing (living people)
Mashonaland Eagles cricketers